Colossal Biosciences is a biotechnology and genetic engineering company working to genetically resurrect the woolly mammoth, the Tasmanian tiger, and the dodo. It has claimed to have the first woolly mammoth hybrid calves by 2027 and will reintroduce them to the Arctic tundra habitat to restore the mammoth steppe grasslands and combat climate change. Endangered Asian elephants reportedly would have mammoth traits. Likewise, it plans to launch a thylacine research project to release Tasmanian tiger joeys back to their original Tasmanian and broader Australian habitat after a period of observation in captivity.

The company develops genetic engineering and reproductive technology for conservation biology. It was founded in 2021 by George Church and Ben Lamm.

History

Foundation
In a 2008 interview with The New York Times, George Church first expressed his interest in engineering a hybrid Asian elephant-mammoth by sequencing the woolly mammoth genome. In 2012, Church was part of a team that pioneered the Crispr-Cas9 gene editing tool, through which the potential for altering genetic code to engineer the envisioned “Mammophant" surfaced. Church presented a talk at the National Geographic Society in 2013, where he mapped out the idea of Colossal. 

Church and his genetics team used CRISPR to copy mammoth genes into the genome of an Asian elephant in 2015. That same year, Church’s lab integrated mammoth genes into the DNA of elephant skin cells; the lab zeroed in on 60 genes that experiments hypothesized as being important to the distinctive traits of mammoths, such as a high-domed skull, ability to hold oxygen at low temperatures, and fatty tissue. Church’s lab reported in 2017 that it had successfully added 45 genes to the genome of an Asian elephant.

In 2019, Ben Lamm, a serial entrepreneur, contacted Church to meet at his lab in Boston. Lamm was intrigued by press reports of Church’s de-extinction idea.

Launch
Colossal was officially launched on September 13, 2021. The launch included a $15 million seed round led by Thomas Tull, Tim Draper, Tony Robbins, Winklevoss Capital Management, Breyer Capital and Richard Garriott. In addition to the de-extinction of the woolly mammoth, Church’s lab hopes to synthesize the elephant endotheliotropic herpesvirus, a virus which infects and kills many young Asian elephants. Colossal also announced that the company’s mission was to preserve endangered animals through gene-editing technology and use those same animals to reshape Arctic ecosystems to combat climate change. 

The company’s genomic modeling software development could potentially bring forth advancements in disease treatment, multiplexed genetic engineering, synthetic biology, and biotechnology. Colossal recruited mammoth and modern elephant experts Michael Hofreiter and Fritz Vollrath, as well as bioethicists R. Alta Charo and S. Matthew Liao for their consultation. Other scientific advisory board members include: Carolyn Bertozzi, Austin Gallagher, Kenneth Lacovara, Beth Shapiro, Helen Hobbs, David Haussler, Elazar Edelman, Joseph DeSimone, and Erez Lieberman Aiden.

In October 2021, Colossal announced its partnership with VGP; through this collaboration, Colossal will provide funding for VGP to sequence and assemble Asian elephant, African elephant, and African forest elephant genomes for preservation purposes. These genomes will be made publicly accessible for research without use restrictions.

In March 2022, Colossal raised $60 million in a Series A funding round led by Thomas Tull with participation from Animoca Brands, Paris Hilton, Charles Hoskinson, bringing the total funding to $75 million.

Science and development
Because the woolly mammoth and Asian elephant share 99.6% of the same DNA, Colossal aims to develop a proxy species by swapping enough key mammoth genes into the Asian elephant genome. Key mammoth genealogical traits include: a 10-centimeter layer of insulating fat, five different types of shaggy hair, and smaller ears to help the hybrid tolerate cold weather.

Colossal’s lab will pair CRISPR/Cas9 with other DNA-editing enzymes, such as integrases, recombinases, and deaminases, to splice woolly mammoth genes into the Asian elephant. The company plans on sequencing both elephant and mammoth samples in order to identify key genes in both species to promote population diversification. By doing so, Colossal hopes to prevent any rogue mutations within the hybrid herd. 

The company plans to use African and Asian elephants as potential surrogates and largely plans to develop artificial elephant wombs lined with uterine tissue as a parallel path to gestation.  Colossal scientists plan on creating these embryos by taking skin cells from Asian elephants and reprogramming them into induced pluripotent stem cells which carry mammoth DNA. Lamm stated that Colossal will use both induced pluripotent stem cells as well as somatic cell nuclear transfer in the process.

In July 2022, VGP and Colossal announced that they successfully sequenced the entire Asian elephant genome; this is the first time that mammalian genetic code has been fully sequenced to this degree since the Human Genome Project was completed in the early 2000s. 

In August 2022, Colossal announced that they would launch a thylacine research project, in hopes of "de-extincting" the Tasmanian tiger. Colossal plans to reintroduce the thylacine proxy to selected areas in Tasmania and broader Australia and claims that, by doing so, this will re-balance ecosystems that have suffered biodiversity loss and degradation since the species disappeared. A successful thylacine proxy birth could also introduce new marsupial-assisted reproductive technology which can aid in other marsupial conservation efforts. Colossal is partnering with the University of Melbourne, and the project is led by Andrew Pask.

In October 2022, Colossal announced that it was developing a vaccine for Elephant Endotheliotropic Herpes Virus (EEHV).

Reception 
In 2022, Colossal was listed as one of the World Economic Forum’s Technology Pioneers and was named Genomics Innovation of the Year by the BioTech Breakthrough Awards.

See also
 Revive & Restore

References

Companies established in 2021
Genome projects
Conservation biology
Biotechnology companies